Daggett Brook is a stream in southern Crow Wing County in the U.S. state of Minnesota. It is a tributary of the Nokasippi River.

Daggett Brook was named for Benjamin F. Daggett, a lumberjack who felled trees there.

References

Rivers of Cass County, Minnesota
Rivers of Crow Wing County, Minnesota
Rivers of Minnesota